Saint Barthélemy requires its residents to register their motor vehicles and display vehicle registration plates. Current plates are European standard 520 mm × 110 mm, the North American standard is also used, and use French stamping dies. The overseas departments and territories of France have three-digit codes, starting with 97, which was originally the single code for them all.

References

Weblinks 
 License plates of Saint Barthélemy at Francoplaque
 License plates of Saint Barthélemy at Worldlicenseplates

Saint Barthélemy
Transport in Saint Barthélemy
Saint Barthélemy-related lists